Senorita from the West is a 1945 American comedy-drama film directed by Frank Strayer from an original screenplay by Howard Dimsdale. The picture stars Allan Jones and Bonita Granville, and was released by Universal Pictures on October 12, 1945.

Plot

Cast list
 Allan Jones as Phil Bradley
 Bonita Granville as Jeannie Blake
 Jess Barker as Tim Winters
 George Cleveland as Cap
 Fuzzy Knight as Rosebud
 Oscar O'Shea as Dusty
 Renny McEvoy as William Wylliams
 Olin Howlin as Justice of Peace
 Danny Mummert as Kid
 Bob Merrill as Elmer
 Emmett Vogan as Producer
 Billy Nelson as Taxi driver
 Jack Clifford as Motor cop
 Spade Cooley as himself

References

External links
 
 
 

American black-and-white films
1945 comedy-drama films
1945 films
American comedy-drama films
Universal Pictures films
Films directed by Frank R. Strayer
1940s American films